Timur Khabibulin and Aleksandr Nedovyesov were the defending champions but lost in the quarterfinals to Nikola Čačić and Nino Serdarušić.

Kevin Krawietz and Andreas Mies won the title after defeating Laurynas Grigelis and Vladyslav Manafov 6–2, 7–6(7–2) in the final.

Seeds

Draw

References
 Main Draw

Almaty Challenger - Doubles